The 2006 Philippine Basketball Association (PBA) Philippine Cup or known as the 2006 Gran Matador Brandy Philippine Basketball Association (PBA) Philippine Cup is the second conference of the 2005-06 PBA season.

The tournament has four rounds, the wildcard playoffs, quarterfinals, semi-finals and the Finals. All nine teams are included in the playoffs.

The Purefoods Chunkee Giants defeated Red Bull Barako in six games of the best-of-seven finals series.

Tournament format
 Double round classifications.
 Wildcard playoffs
 Sixth to Ninth place teams will play in a single round robin, with their win–loss records in the classification phase being carried over.
 Team with the best record after three games will move to the quarterfinals.
 If a team wins all three games in the round robin despite not having the best record of the four team, a knockout match will be held against the team with the best record for the final quarterfinals spot.
 Quarterfinals
 Fourth seed advance outright to the best-of-five quarterfinals, to meet fifth seed team (QF-A).
 Third seed advance outright to the best-of-five quarterfinals, to meet winner of the Wildcard playoffs (QF-B).
Semi-Finals
 Second seed advance outright to the best-of-seven semi-finals, to meet winner of the QF-B (SF-A).
 First seed advance outright to the best-of-seven semi-finals, to meet winner of the QF-A (SF-B).
 Finals
 Winners of SF-A and SF-B face off for the best-of-seven Finals for the 2006 Philippine Cup Championship.
 Losers of SF-A and SF-B face off for a one-game playoff for the Third Place trophy.

Classification round

Team standings

Fifth seed playoff

 Coca-Cola captures third outright quarterfinals berth, Air21 is relegated to the wildcard playoffs, a round-robin format.

Wildcard phase

Bracket

Quarterfinals 
Games 1 to 4 were held at the Araneta Coliseum. Game 5 of Red Bull vs Ginebra was at the Ynares Center.

|}

Semifinals
Games 1 to 5 were held in the Araneta Coliseum, while Games 6 and 7 were held at the Cuneta Astrodome.

|}

Third place playoff

Finals

Broadcasters 
The play-by-play commentators are Mico Halili and Ed Picson, while the color commentators are Norman Black, Quinito Henson and Chot Reyes. The courtside reporters are Richard del Rosario, Eric Reyes, Jason Webb and Patricia Bermudez-Hizon. The grand draw of Hope and Winston's Sports Ride promo was also broadcast during the halftime of Game 4 of the finals, as the said event will be the final promotional segment to be sponsored by tobacco companies broadcast during the finals until the Philippine government announced that commercials and sponsorships related to tobacco products on TV and Radio will be banned starting on January 1, 2007.

Further information
 Talk N' Text failed to enter the quarterfinals for the first time since the 1998 All-Filipino Cup, when the then-Mobiline Phone Pals failed to enter the semifinals of the said tournament.
 Barangay Ginebra failed to enter the semifinals for the first since the 2003 Reinforced Conference.
 Coca-Cola and Alaska met for the first time since Alaska won the 2003 Invitational tournament over the Tigers.
 Alaska's defeat in the semifinals was the third time that the Aces fail to beat Purefoods after leading a series 2-0. In 1990, Alaska lost to Purefoods, 3-2 in the Third Conference Finals after they won the first two games of the series. In 2002, the Aces lost to the then-TJ Hotdogs in seven games after taking a 2-0 series lead. In the semifinals, they had a 2-0 and 3-1 series leads.
 San Miguel has not won a seventh game since 1992, since defeating Purefoods for the Third Conference crown. Since then, the Beermen lost to Alaska in the 1995 Governors Cup Finals and the 1998 All-Filipino Cup, to Coca-Cola in the 2003 Reinforced Conference Finals and to Red Bull in the 2006 Philippine Cup semifinals.
 Red Bull has won all Game 7s they have played since joining the league in 2000. Red Bull defeated Talk N' Text for the 2002 Commissioners Cup trophy. In the 2006 Fiesta Conference semifinals, the Bulls beat Barangay Ginebra and in the 2006 Philippine Cup Playoffs semis, they won over San Miguel.
 It was Purefoods' 11th finals appearance in the All-Filipino Conference, now called as the Philippine Cup since the 2004-2005 event. They have won four All-Filipino titles in history with the 1997 edition as their last.
 A win by Red Bull in the finals would sweep all the titles available in the 2005-2006 PBA season. It would be the first since Alaska won the PBA grand slam in 1996. However, the term grand slam, provided a Bulls win in the Philippine Cup, is disputed as of the moment.
 The Red Bull-Purefoods finals duel was the first back-to-back conference finals matchup since 1998, when Mobiline Phone Pals and the Formula Shell Zoom Masters met in the special 1998 PBA Centennial Cup and the 1998 PBA Governors Cup. The Phone Pals won 67-66 in the one game Centennial final, while the Zoom Masters defeated Mobiline in seven full games to win the Governor's Cup. With the Centennial Cup being classified as a special tournament, the last back-to-back full conference Finals match-ups was between Alaska and San Miguel in the same 1998 season, at the All-Filipino and Commissioner's Cups.

References

External links
 PBA.ph

Philippine Cup
PBA Philippine Cup